Edward Cowan may refer to:
 Ed Cowan (born 1982), Australian Test cricketer
 Edward J. Cowan, Scottish historian
 Ted Cowan, British comic book writer